Jan Majewski (born 27 November 1973) is a German former professional footballer who played as a forward.

References

External links
 

1973 births
Living people
German footballers
Association football forwards
Bundesliga players
2. Bundesliga players
VfL Bochum players
VfL Bochum II players
SC Verl players
SV Wilhelmshaven players
VfB Oldenburg players
Place of birth missing (living people)